The Violin Concerto No. 3 in G major, K. 216, was composed by Wolfgang Amadeus Mozart in Salzburg in 1775 when he was 19 years old. In a letter to his father, Mozart called it the "Straßburg-Concert". Researchers believe this epithet comes from the motive in the third movement's central section, a local, minuet-like dance that already had appeared as a musette-imitating tune in a symphony by Carl Ditters von Dittersdorf.

Instrumentation
The work is scored for solo violin, two flutes (second movement only), two oboes (tacet in the second movement), two horns in G and D, and strings.

Movements 

The piece is in three movements:

I. Allegro 

The Allegro is in sonata form, opening with a G major theme played by the orchestra. The main theme is a bright and happy discussion between the solo violin and the accompaniment, followed by a modulation to the dominant D major, then to its parallel key D minor. It experiments in other keys, but does not settle and eventually, heads back to the tonic, G major, in the recapitulation.

II. Adagio 

The second movement is in ternary form in the dominant key of D major. The orchestra begins with the main theme, which the violin imitates one octave higher. The winds then play a dance-like motif in A major, which the violin concludes. The violin restates the main theme in A major, although the melody features A sharp instead of A natural, creating a brief modulation to B minor. It soon modulates back to A major, then to the home key of D major through the main theme. After the cadenza, the violin plays the main theme again, thus concluding the movement in D.

This is the only movement in the five violin concertos by Mozart where a pair of flutes are used instead of oboes.

III. Rondeau 

The finale is a rondo in G major and in  time. Mozart inserts into the rondo a short G minor Andante section followed by a longer G major Allegretto section, both in cut time.

Notable recordings

References

External links 

3
1775 compositions
Compositions in G major